Gustavo Gutiérrez (born 1928) is a Peruvian philosopher, theologian, and Dominican priest

Gustavo Gutiérrez may also refer to:

Gustavo Gutiérrez (fencer) (born 1933), Venezuelan fencer
Gustavo Gutiérrez (athlete) (born 1939), Ecuadorian long-distance runner
Gustavo Gutiérrez (footballer) (born 1996), Mexican footballer